Fallbach Waterfall is a waterfall in the Maltatal valley of Austria in the Austrian Alps near Malta. It is particularly dramatic during snow-melt season.  The waterfall is part of the Hohe Tauern National Park.

External links
 Fallbach waterfall with play-park

Waterfalls of Austria
Landforms of Carinthia (state)
Tourist attractions in Carinthia (state)